Doxey is a civil parish in the Borough of Stafford, Staffordshire, England.  It contains two listed buildings that are recorded in the National Heritage List for England. Both the listed buildings are designated at Grade II, the lowest of the three grades, which is applied to "buildings of national importance and special interest".  The parish contains the village of Doxey, and both listed buildings are houses, one with its original part timber framed, and the other in Georgian style.


Buildings

References

Citations

Sources

Lists of listed buildings in Staffordshire